Venasca is a comune (municipality) in the Province of Cuneo in the Italian region Piedmont, located about  southwest of Turin and about  northwest of Cuneo.

The municipality of Venasca contains the frazioni (subdivisions, mainly villages and hamlets) Bonelli, Bricco, Collino, Miceli, Peralba, and Rolfa.

Venasca borders the following municipalities: Brondello, Brossasco, Isasca, Pagno, Piasco, Rossana and Busca.

Demographic evolution

References

Cities and towns in Piedmont